High Productivity Computing Systems (HPCS) is a DARPA project for developing a new generation of economically viable high productivity computing systems for national security and industry in the 2002–10 timeframe.

The HPC Challenge (High-performance computers challenge) is part of the project. An HPCS goal is to create a multi petaflop systems.

Participants
 at phase I, II and III
 IBM with PERCS (Productive, Easy-to-use, Reliable Computer System) based on  POWER7 processor, X10, AIX and Linux operating systems and General Parallel File System
 Cray with Cascade, Chapel and Lustre filesystem
 at phase I and II
 Sun Microsystems with proximity communication and research projects of silicon photonics, object-based storage, the Fortress programming language, interval computing
 MIT Lincoln Laboratory
 at phase I only
 HP
 Silicon Graphics (SGI)
 MITRE

Also (status unknown from official site):

 Lawrence Livermore National Laboratory
 Los Alamos National Laboratory

A vivid description of this type of work was given by James Bamford in his March 15, 2012 article:

See also
 Exascale computing program
 Multiprogram Research Facility

References

External links
 HPC Challenge
 Last valid Waybackmachine cache of DARPA site's section about HPCS
 DARPA Selects Cray and IBM for Final Phase of HPCS

DARPA
Parallel computing
DARPA projects